Madwoman may refer to:
a woman who is insane
Madwoman (book), a poetry collection by Shara McCallum
Madwoman: A Contemporary Opera, by Mem Nahadr
"Mad Woman", a 2020 song by Taylor Swift from Folklore